Obum Gwacham (born March 20, 1991) is a Nigerian professional gridiron football defensive end for the BC Lions of the Canadian Football League (CFL). He has played for the New Orleans Saints and the New York Jets. He played college football for the Oregon State Beavers.

Professional career

Seattle Seahawks
On Saturday, May 2, 2015, Gwacham was drafted by the Seattle Seahawks with the 209th pick in the sixth round.

On September 5, 2015, he was waived by the Seahawks.

New Orleans Saints
On September 6, 2015, he was claimed off waivers by the New Orleans Saints. He was placed on injured reserve on September 28, 2016. On September 2, 2017, the Saints released Gwacham.

Arizona Cardinals
On September 4, 2017, Gwacham was signed to the Arizona Cardinals' practice squad.

New York Jets
On October 4, 2017, Gwacham was signed by the New York Jets off the Cardinals' practice squad.

On August 31, 2018, Gwacham was waived by the Jets.

Arizona Hotshots
In 2019, Gwacham joined the Arizona Hotshots of the Alliance of American Football.

Indianapolis Colts
On June 13, 2019, Gwacham signed with the Indianapolis Colts. He was released on August 31, 2019.

Tampa Bay Vipers
Gwacham was selected by the Tampa Bay Vipers in the 21st Round (round one of phase three) of the 2020 XFL Draft. He was placed on injured reserve before the start of the season on January 21, 2020. He was activated from injured reserve on February 24, 2020. He had his contract terminated when the league suspended operations on April 10, 2020.

BC Lions
Gwacham signed with the BC Lions of the CFL on December 9, 2020.

NFL Career Statistics

Regular season

Personal life
Gwacham was born in Nigeria but moved to Chino Hills, California with his family when he was seven.

Notes

External links
 
 Oregon State Beavers bio
 Gwacham at ESPN.com
 Obum Gwacham Combine Profile

1991 births
Living people
American football defensive ends
American football wide receivers
Arizona Cardinals players
Arizona Hotshots players
BC Lions players
Indianapolis Colts players
New Orleans Saints players
New York Jets players
Nigerian players of American football
Oregon State Beavers football players
People from Chino Hills, California
Players of American football from California
Seattle Seahawks players
Sportspeople from Onitsha
Sportspeople from San Bernardino County, California
Tampa Bay Vipers players